Vladislav Kozlov, (born 15 March 1997) is a Russian swimmer.

Career 
In 2014, Kozlov's first major international meet at the 2014 European Junior Championships, he won a bronze medal in men's 50 m butterfly.

In June 2015 at the inaugural 2015 European Games in Baku, Kozlov won the gold medal with the Russian Team in men's 4 × 100 m medley (with Daniil Pakhomov, Anton Chupkov and Filipp Shopin touching in 3:36.38), a new junior world record breaking the previous record held by Russia in 3:38.02 at the 2014 Youth Olympics. and in 4 × 100 m mixed freestyle (with Arina Openysheva, Elisei Stepanov and Mariia Kameneva at a time of 3:30.30). Kozlov also won bronze in the individual men's 100 m freestyle and with the Russian Team in men's 4 × 100 m freestyle.

On August 25–30, Kozlov competed at the 2015 World Junior Championships in Singapore, he won gold with the Russian team in men's 4x100 medley (with Daniil Pakhomov, Anton Chupkov, Roman Larin, touching in 3:36.44), taking a meets record. and bronze in mixed 4 × 100 m freestyle (with Mariia Kameneva, Arina Openysheva and Igor Shadrin).

References

External links
 
Vladislav Kozlov Sports bio

1997 births
Living people
Sportspeople from Tolyatti
Russian male swimmers
Russian male freestyle swimmers
Male medley swimmers
European Games gold medalists for Russia
European Games medalists in swimming
Swimmers at the 2015 European Games
European Games bronze medalists for Russia